is a Japanese manga series written by Araki Joh and illustrated by Kenji Nagatomo. Its focus is Ryū Sasakura, a genius bartender who uses his talents to ease the worries and soothe the souls of troubled customers. The manga was first serialized in Shueisha's Japanese seinen magazine Super Jump from 2004 to 2011. The individual chapters were collected by Shueisha and released in twenty-one tankōbon volumes.

Bartender was later adapted into an anime television series, broadcast in 2006 on Fuji Television. The manga was also adapted into a Japanese television drama in 2011 that aired on TV Asahi. Three spin-off manga (Bartender à Paris, Bartender à Tokyo, and Bartender 6stp) have been serialized in Grand Jump and Grand Jump Premium between 2012 and 2019. In Japan, Bartender has sold over 2.8 million copies, while it received a mixed reception from English-language manga and anime publications. 

A new anime project has been announced.

Plot
Upon returning from his studies in France, Ryū works as an assistant for a senior bartender at the bar Lapin. Rumor holds that potential patrons cannot simply find and enter Eden Hall; rather they must be invited in by the host.

She is the office lady of the company and requires him to compete for the job of bartender in the hotel. However, upon Miwa insistence, Taizo meets Ryū and becomes fascinated by his abilities, requesting her to insist on Ryū to bring him to work in the hotel.

Over the course of the manga, various other figures, all of whom share unusual troubles and heavy burdens, are invited into Eden Hall and are treated to Sasakura's fine drinks, which, with guidance from the young bartender, lead the customers to reflect upon their lives and decide on a course of action to tackle their problems.

Themes
Bartender is predominantly an episodic series, and although the clients and problems vary, each story revolves around problems being resolved through the right drink. Alcohol is not depicted as a potential problem that might have negative effects such as drunkenness in the series; instead, "Bartender insists the right drink at the right time ... is about starting an earnest conversation with oneself." To know which beverage is the most appropriate, according to the series, a bartender must be more than a liquor connoisseur; he or she must be a good observer. For example, Ryū can deduce one's feelings by looking at one's hands and can know if someone is telling the truth or not. As such, it is not just about drinking; "the stories of the customers are sometimes, if not almost always, as important as and at times even parallel to the history of the liquors imbibed."

Publication

The Bartender manga was written by Araki Joh, illustrated by Kenji Nagatomo, and serialized in Shueisha's biweekly seinen magazine Super Jump between May 2004 and September 2011. With Super Jumps cancellation, the series moved to the then–new Grand Jump, in which Bartender was serialized during November and December 2011. Its chapters were eventually collected into twenty-one volumes, with the first volume released on December 3, 2004, and the final volume on February 17, 2012.  An , which follows Ryū's return from Paris, was released into four parts, with the first two volumes released on September 18, 2014 and the last two volumes on October 17, 2014.

The series was completely published by Haksan Publishing in South Korea, and by Sharp Point Press in Taiwan.

Spin-offs
A spin-off series titled Bartender à Paris, with a new protagonist, began in Grand Jump on January 4, 2012; Nagatomo was replaced by Osamu Kajisa for the series. The series finished on October 2, 2013. It was collected into six volumes; the first was published on June 19, 2012, and the last on December 19, 2013. 

A follow-up, Bartender à Tokyo, began in the same magazine on November 6, 2013, and was later moved to Grand Jump Premium on December 24, 2015. The series finished on August 17, 2016. It was collected into eight volumes; the first was released on April 18, 2014, and the last on October 19, 2016. 

The fourth and last installment of the series, Bartender 6stp, was serialized on Grand Jump Premium and Grand Jump Mucha from August 24, 2016, to December 25, 2019. The 6stp first volume was published on March 17, 2017, and the last—the fourth volume—was released on February 19, 2020.

Both Bartender à Paris and Bartender à Tokyo were licensed in South Korea by Haksan Publishing and in Taiwan by Sharp Point Press.

Anime adaptation

Bartender was adapted into an eleven episode anime series directed by Masaki Watanabe, written by Yasuhiro Imagawa, and produced by Palm Studio. The anime uses New Wave film methods, including breaking the fourth wall, "stagy narration, [and] odd transitions". It also explores staging techniques, such as monologues, spotlights, and half-screens showing storyteller and narrated story at the same time. It was broadcast on Fuji TV with the first episode airing on October 15, 2006, and the last episode airing on December 31, 2006. Pony Canyon compiled the series and released it on five separate DVDs between December 20, 2006 and April 18, 2007. Anime Limited announced at MCM London Comic Con 2018 that they had acquired the series for release in the United Kingdom and Ireland. Two years later, Anime Limited announced the license for Northern America and a partnership with Shout! Factory to release the series. It was released both digitally and on a two-disc Blu-ray set on January 19, 2021 in the United Kingdom, Ireland, the United States and Canada.

The music for Bartender was composed by Kaoruko Ōtake, and subsequently released on an official soundtrack album on November 29, 2006 produced by Sony Music Japan under the DefStar Records label. Both the opening theme, "Bartender", and the ending theme, were performed by Natural High. The opening theme, however, featured Junpei Shiina. Both themes were released by Sony as the single "Hajimari no Hito/Bartender" on December 13, 2006.

A new anime project was announced on October 21, 2022.

Television drama

In November 2010, through the 24th issue of Super Jump, it was announced that a live-action Japanese television drama of Bartender would be produced, starring Masaki Aiba, who had been training with a professional bartender since September of that year, and Shihori Kanjiya. Directed by Osamu Katayama and written by Natsuko Takahashi, the new series aired on TV Asahi's "Friday Night Drama" time slot from February 4, 2011 to April 1, 2011. The series theme song, "Lotus", was performed by Arashi, a boy band of which Aiba is a member. On August 5, 2011, during an event at the Tokyo Tower, TC Entertainment released all episodes of the Bartender drama in DVD and Blu-ray box sets. Several tie-in products were also released, including straps, cups, pens, and candles.

Reception
Bartender had sold more than 2.8 million copies in Japan as of January 2011; individual volumes frequently appeared on lists of best-selling manga in that country. The anime television series finale obtained a 3.4 percent television viewership rating, making it the fourth most–watched anime–related program that week. The television drama debut had an 11 percent television viewership rating, while its finale earned an 11.7 rating. Its DVD box set sold 7,978 copies, considered a "successful" number by TV Asahi, and its related merchandise also "sold well." At Nikkan Sports Drama Grand Prix, Bartender was voted the fourth–best drama, and Masaki the third–best actor in a drama. The television series also received coverage from the Nippon Bartenders Association.

David Welsh, in The Manga Curmudgeon, declared the way Ryu used liquor to help other people "a beautiful, uplifting message for a comic. Okay, maybe not, but it sounds like a lot of fun." At Ani-Gamers, a reviewer known as "Ink" wrote that the series unduly "romanticizes" a bar, but praised its storytelling and staging techniques, the narration, its "casual dialog and effective visuals", and its balance. He described it as "a love letter to liquor as opposed to the consumption thereof," while Bamboo Dong of Anime News Network (ANN) called it "a delicious ode to mixology". Michael Toole, also for ANN, wrote that although it is "pretty cheesy...there is something deeply, compulsively watchable about Bartender in spite of its plainness. It's gentle and sentimental, with powerful and surprising transitions."

Writing for THEM Anime Reviews, Tim Jones called it "an interesting concept for an anime." Jones asserted that the animation was not "all that stellar", but commented that the drinks in CG "look quite good." He found the character designs "fairly generic" except for Ryū, and the music "a little repetitive" over the 11 episodes, although he stressed that it "fits the atmosphere of the show." On the other hand, ANN's Carl Kimlinger criticized Bartender's concept "as insipid, silly, and downright awful" and "monumentally uninspired". He praised its animation but said "no stylistic elaboration on earth can save it from boring its audience to tears". Erin Finnegan from the same site dubbed its graphics "craptastic" and called the idea of solving individuals' problems through drinks "cheesy."

References

External links
Official TV Asahi live action adaptation webpage 
Official Shueisha webpage 
Official Fuji TV anime adaptation webpage 

 
2011 Japanese television series debuts
2011 Japanese television series endings
Alcohol in popular culture
Bartending
Comics set in Tokyo
Cooking in anime and manga
Fuji TV original programming
Seinen manga
Sharp Point Press titles
Shueisha franchises
Shueisha manga
Slice of life anime and manga
TV Asahi television dramas